A cruiser motorcycle is a motorcycle in the style of American machines from the 1930s to the early 1960s, including those made by Harley-Davidson, Indian, Excelsior and Henderson.

Characteristics
The riding position usually places the feet forward and the hands up, with the spine erect or leaning back slightly. Typical cruiser engines emphasize easy rideability and shifting, with plenty of low-end torque but not necessarily large amounts of horsepower, and are traditionally V-twins, but inline engines have become more common. Cruisers with greater performance than usual, including more horsepower, stronger brakes and better suspension, are often called power cruisers.

Market share
Japanese companies began producing models evocative of the early cruisers in the mid-1980s, and by 1997 the market had grown to nearly 60 percent of the US market, such that a number of motorcycle manufacturers including BMW, Honda, Moto Guzzi, Yamaha, Suzuki, Triumph and Victory have currently or have had important models evocative of the American cruiser.

Terminology
Harley-Davidsons and other cruisers with extensive luggage for touring have been called, sometimes disparagingly or jocularly, baggers, or full baggers, as well as dressers, full dressers, or full dress tourers. These terms are no longer limited to cruisers, but may be any touring motorcycle.

Customisation
Cruisers are often the basis for custom motorcycle projects that result in a bike modified to suit the owner's ideals, and as such are a source of pride and accomplishment.

Power cruiser
Power cruiser is a name used to distinguish bikes in the cruiser class that have higher levels of power. They often come with upgraded brakes and suspensions, better ground clearance, and premium surface finishes, as well as more exotic or modern muscular (non-traditional cruiser) styling.

Many power cruisers and Japanese cruisers of the 1980s have more neutral riding positions. While traditional cruisers have limited performance and turning ability due to a low-slung design, power cruisers or similar performance-oriented cruisers can be leaned farther for better cornering. Otherwise, customization can increase the bike's lean angle to enable cornering at higher speeds.

See also
 Outline of motorcycles and motorcycling

Notes

Motorcycle classifications